Mads Alstrup (1808-1876) was the first Danish portrait photographer with his own studio. For 16 years, he produced an enormous number of daguerreotypes, in Copenhagen and the provinces, before his business suffered from the financial crisis of 1857. He moved to Sweden in 1858 and continued to take portraits there for the remainder of his life. He is considered to be one of Denmark's pioneers in the practice of photography.

Daguerreotype portraits in Denmark

Born in Viborg and trained as a goldsmith, Alstrup initially had a business in Randers in Jutland. In the summer of 1842, he moved to Copenhagen and set up a daguerreotype studio behind the Hercules Pavilion in the Rosenborg Gardens. In this popular area of the city, he had no difficulty in finding clients interested in having their portraits taken.

From 1843 to 1848, he travelled around Denmark, spending a few days or weeks in different towns where he set up temporary studios. In 1849, he finally settled in Copenhagen, opening a studio at a central location on Østergade near Kongens Nytorv.

While Alstrup was by no means an artist, he was a competent tradesman and, unlike some of the more artistic photographers of his day, he could run a profitable business. Constantly investing in new equipment, the quality of his work improved year by year. Indeed, it is estimated he produced some 33,000 daguerreotypes in the 16 years he worked in Denmark.

Swedish period

After leaving Denmark in 1857, Alstrup moved to Sweden where he travelled from place to place, much as he had done in his early Danish career. In 1859 he was in Hälsingborg and Kristianstad and in 1860, Gothenburg where he stayed for a few years. In 1863, he practiced in Malmö with G.S. Ekeund. He died in Falun, Sweden, in 1876.

See also
Photography in Denmark
History of photography

References

1808 births
1876 deaths
19th-century Danish photographers
Pioneers of photography
People from Viborg Municipality
Photographers from Copenhagen